Edward Rubenstein (December 5, 1924 – March 11, 2019)  was an American doctor of internal medicine, with major contributions in the fields of medical education, research (physics, biophysics and biochemistry), and the arts.

Mechanisms of blood clotting
Edward Rubenstein was an Internal Medicine physician, with areas of expertise which included clotting disorders that predispose to pulmonary embolism.

Stanford Synchrotron Radiation Project

In the early 1970s Stanford University marked a landmark period in particle physics research with the creation of the colliding beam storage ring, called the Stanford Positron Electron Accelerating Ring (SPEAR) in 1972. Among the famous discoveries were the J/psi and tau particles. A byproduct of the ring's operation was an intense beam of synchrotron radiation.  Rubenstein and his colleagues E. Barrie Hughes and Robert Hofstadter posited that there may be numerous applications of this intensely powerful, tuneable, and linearly polarized radiation to biomedical imaging, including intravenous coronary arteriography.  They devised a synchrotron radiation based imaging system which has been used worldwide.

Rubenstein proposed that the polarized synchrotron light which is emitted by relativistic electrons orbiting neutron stars (linear in the plane of rotation, with opposite helicity above and below the plane) would selectively photolyze chiral molecules floating on grains in nearby space.  This mechanism would  produce an enantiomeric excess of either right- or left-handed molecules which can be delivered to Earth by passing comets.

Nonprotein amino acids
In addition, Rubenstein pioneered research on the consequences of the misincorporation of nonprotein amino acids, especially the lower homologue of proline, azetidine-2-carboxylic acid (Aze). This compound eludes the gate-keeping function of the prolyl tRNAs, and enters a wide range of proteins.  For instance, the central region in a consensus epitope of myelin basic protein consists of the sequence:  proline, arginine, threonine, proline, proline, proline.  Dairy milk from cattle fed sugar beet byproducts is high in Aze, therefore infants fed such milk are exposed to Aze in their diets.

Editorships and authorships

Rubenstein contributed numerous book publications in the medical and physics literature. The volume entitled Introduction to Molecular Medicine was selected by the British Medical Association as the Best Book Published in Medicine in 1995.

Editorships
 Editorial Advisory Board, Current Contents / Clinical Practice, 1973-1986.
 Founding Editor-in-Chief, Scientific American MEDICINE, 1978-1994.
 Editor, Synchrotron Radiation Handbook, Vol. IV, North-Holland Publishing Co., 1990.
 Co-Editor, Synchrotron Radiation in Life Sciences, Oxford University Press, 1994.
 Series Editor, Molecular Medicine, Scientific, American, Inc., New York, 1994.

Textbooks
 Rubenstein E.  Intensive Medical Care: Edward Rubenstein McGraw Hill, 1971.
 Tavares BM, Rubenstein E, Scott, AA, Paras M, Wilson A, Ney W. Tratamento Intensivo Technicas de Atendimento, Rio de Janeiro, 1975.
 Ebashi S, Rubenstein E, Koch M.  Volume Editors, Handbook on Synchrotron Radiation, North-Holland Physics Publishing, Amsterdam, 1990.
 Huxley H, Ebashi S, Mitsui T, Schmahl G, Rubenstein E, Goodhead DT, Sasaki T, eds. Synchrotron Radiation in the Life Sciences, Volume 2, Oxford University Press, Oxford, 1994.
 Rubenstein E. Introduction to Molecular Medicine, Scientific American Medicine, New York, 1994.
 Haber E. ed., Rubenstein E, vol. ed.  Molecular Cardiovascular Medicine, Scientific American Medicine, New York, 1995.
 Bishop JM, Weinberg RA, eds., Rubenstein E., vol. ed.  Molecular Oncology, Scientific American Medicine, New York, 1996.
 Martin JB, ed., Rubenstein E, vol. ed. Molecular Neurology, Scientific American Medicine, New York, 1998.

References

1924 births
2019 deaths
American nuclear medicine physicians
University of Cincinnati alumni
Stanford University faculty
National Institutes of Health faculty
Physicians from Cincinnati
21st-century American physicists
21st-century American chemists
American molecular biologists
Members of the National Academy of Medicine